Camelia Marie Somers (born October 2, 1995) is an American actress and Suzanne Somers' granddaughter. She is known for her television role as Charlotte on the daytime soap opera The Bold and the Beautiful on CBS.

Personal life
Somers was born in Los Angeles, California. Her father, Bruce Somers Jr., is the owner and chief storyteller of Sincbox Media. Her mother, Caroline Somers, is a writer and a producer. Somers has done commercials in the past at a young age. She attended Harvard Westlake in Studio City, California where she played a leading role in the school's production of the musical Hairspray. She was also involved in choir and cheer/dance. Somers attended the University of Southern California graduating in 2018.

Career
Somers began her acting career in The Bold and the Beautiful as 
an intern. She is now a recurring actress on the show playing the role of Charlotte.

References

External links

1995 births
Living people
American television actresses
Actresses from Los Angeles
University of Southern California alumni
Harvard-Westlake School alumni
21st-century American women